Robert de Lasteyrie (1849-1921) was a French archivist and politician. He served as a member of the Chamber of Deputies from 1893 to 1898, representing Corrèze.

References

1849 births
1921 deaths
Politicians from Paris
Robert
Members of the 6th Chamber of Deputies of the French Third Republic
Members of the Ligue de la patrie française
French archivists
École Nationale des Chartes alumni
French military personnel of the Franco-Prussian War